Phellopilus is a fungal genus  in the family Hymenochaetaceae. Circumscribed in 2001, the genus is monotypic, containing the single widespread species Phellopilus nigrolimitatus.

References

Hymenochaetaceae
Monotypic Basidiomycota genera